The 1992 500 km of Magny-Cours was the final race of the FIA Sportscar World Championship for both the 1992 season and overall as the championship failed the materialize for 1993.  It was run on October 18, 1992.

Peugeot used this home race to show off their new second evolution of the 905, running it for a few laps in practice before it was withdrawn.  Peugeot instead ran a third 905 Evo 1B for the home crowd in the race.  With the demise of the SWC, the 905 Evo 2 was never raced in competition.  Euro Racing withdrew from the event following scrutineering after the arrest of team owner Charles Zwolsman.

Official results

Class winners in bold.  Cars failing to complete 90% of winner's distance marked as Not Classified (NC).

Statistics
 Pole Position - #2 Peugeot Talbot Sport - 1:16.415 - Philippe Alliot.
 Fastest Lap - #1 Peugeot Talbot Sport
 Average Speed - 183.111 km/h

External links
 Official Results

500km Of Magny-cours, 1992
Magny-Cours